Eremophila yinnetharrensis is a species of flowering plant in the family Scrophulariaceae and is endemic to a restricted area of Western Australia. It is an erect, wispy shrub with sessile, lance-shaped leaves with the narrower end towards the base and purple flowers. It is only known from near Yinnetharra Station in the Gascoyne region.

Description
Its branches are grey and densely covered with branched hairs. The four stamens are enclosed in the petal tube. Flowering mainly occurs from June to September but also at other times after rainfall.

Taxonomy and naming 
This species was first formally described in 2016 by Bevan Buirchell and Andrew Phillip Brown in the journal Nuytsia from specimens collected by Joff Start from Yinnetharra Station in 2005. The specific epithet (yinnetharrensis) is a reference to Yinnetharra Station where the species was first found.

Distribution and habitat
Eremophila yinnetharrensis is only known from the type location where it grows on stony rises in the Gascoyne biogeographic region.

Conservation
Eremophila scrobiculata classified as "Priority One" by the Government of Western Australia Department of Parks and Wildlife, meaning that it is known from only one or a few locations which are potentially at risk.

References

Eudicots of Western Australia
yinnetharrensis
Rosids of Western Australia
Endemic flora of Western Australia
Plants described in 2016
Taxa named by Bevan Buirchell
Taxa named by Andrew Phillip Brown